Iulian Popa (born 20 July 1984) is a Romanian former footballer who played as an attacking midfielder. In his career Popa played for various Romanian clubs such as: Voința Sibiu, Brașov, Oțelul Galați, Rapid București or Hermannstadt, among others.

Honours
Hermannstadt
Cupa României: Runner-up 2017–18

References

External links
 
 

1984 births
Living people
People from Brașov County
Romanian footballers
Association football midfielders
Liga I players
Liga II players
SCM Râmnicu Vâlcea players
CSU Voința Sibiu players
FC Brașov (1936) players
ASC Oțelul Galați players
FC Rapid București players
FC Hermannstadt players